Raymond Neenan (born 7 September 1952) is a British judoka.  He competed in the men's half-lightweight event at the 1980 Summer Olympics. He became a two times champion of Great Britain, winning the featherweight category at the British Judo Championships in 1975 and 1976.

References

1952 births
Living people
British male judoka
Olympic judoka of Great Britain
Judoka at the 1980 Summer Olympics
Place of birth missing (living people)